San Rafael La Independencia is a municipality in the Guatemalan department of Huehuetenango. Their native is akateko.

Municipalities of the Huehuetenango Department